The Prairie Meadows Cornhusker Handicap is an American Grade III thoroughbred horse race held annually at the end of June at Prairie Meadows in Altoona, Iowa. The race is open to horses age three years and older and currently offers a purse of $300,000. Raced at a distance of 1 miles on dirt, from 1966 through 1973 it was run at 1 miles.

Inaugurated in 1966, the Cornhusker Handicap was originally run at the Ak-Sar-Ben Racetrack in Omaha, Nebraska which closed in 1995. The first edition was won by Royal Gunner who was ridden by future U.S. Racing Hall of Fame inductee Bill Hartack.

Julie Krone was the first female jockey to compete in the Cornhusker Handicap and the first female jockey to win it when she captured the 1988 edition aboard Palace March.

The Cornhusker Handicap purse was reduced to $100,00 in 2020 due to the COVID-19 pandemic along with the Iowa Derby and Iowa Oaks purses.

Records
Time record: (at current distance of  miles)
 1:46.62 – Beboppin Baby (1998)

Most wins:
 2 – Vale of Tears (1968, 1969) and Joey Bob (1972, 1973)

Most wins by a Jockey:
 4 – Larry J. Durousseau (1967, 1968, 1969, 1970)

Most wins by a Trainer:
 3 – Brad H. Cox (2014, 2020, 2021)
 3 – Albert Vizcaya (1968, 1969, 1970)
 3 – Jack Van Berg (1972, 1973, 1985)

Most wins by an Owner:
 3 – Mrs. Raymond Bauer (1968, 1969, 1970)

Winners

References

Graded stakes races in the United States
Open mile category horse races
Horse races in the United States
Recurring sporting events established in 1966
1966 establishments in Nebraska